European Central Securities Depositories Association (ECSDA) is the official association of the Central Securities Depository industry in Europe. 

The association provides a forum for Central Securities Depositories (CSDs) to exchange views and take forward projects of mutual interest. It aims to promote a constructive dialogue between the CSD community, European and Global public authorities and other stakeholders aiming at contributing to an efficient and risk-averse infrastructure for financial markets.

Management 
Since May 2017, ECSDA is led by Anna Kulik, Secretary General of the association. The Association is governed by the General Meeting of its members, the Board of Directors and the Executive Committee. The association governance is specified in the Articles of the Association and its by-laws. While the General Meeting gathers the representatives of the ECSDA Members, the Board Directors are appointed in a personal capacity.

Main activities 
The association has 5 permanent working groups:

 Risk management of Central Securities Depositories,
 Public Policy for Financial Market Infrastructures and Central Securities Depositories, 
 Settlement efficiency and discipline, 
 Compliance and
 Harmonisation/corporate actions.

The association also focuses on Cyber resilience, technological innovation and other. It regularly publishes research reports on CSDs, including technical standards, statistics, positions on regulatory issues. It provides educational material on the role of CSDs in financial markets, including Frequently Asked Questions, an online tutorial and facts about the CSD industry. The association acts as the prime interlocutor for European public authorities and other market associations active in the post-trade sector.

Developments 
It holds regular expert discussions and conferences. In 2018, ECSDA held a Conference on new technology for Financial Market Infrastructures. In 2019, ECSDA held a conference “Towards the Financial Market Infrastructures of Tomorrow”.

On 27 November 2018, ID2S a new French CSD based on blockchain joined ECSDA. In March 2019, AIX CSD also became a new associate member of the association.

In March 2022, in reaction to the 2022 Russian invasion of Ukraine, the European Central Securities Depository Association suspended the Russian depository National Settlement Depository (NSD) from membership in the association.

Membership 
The association has 41 member companies, headquartered in 36 countries. Coming from the European Economic Area and beyond. ECSDA Members are based in the geographical Europe and its borders. Based on the ECSDA by-laws, a non-European CSD can become an ECSDA associate member.

List of ECSDA members 
AT - OeKB CSD GmbH

BA - Central Registry of Securities JSC Banja Luka (CR HoV RS)

BA - Registry of Securities (RVP)

BE - Euroclear Bank

BE - Euroclear Belgium

BG - Central Depository AD (CDAD)

CH - SIX SIS Ltd

CY - Cyprus Stock Exchange (CSE) 

CZ - Central Securities Depository Prague (CDCP)

DE - Clearstream Banking AG

DK - Euronext Securities | Copenhagen

ES - Iberclear

FI - Euroclear Finland

FR - Euroclear France

GR - Hellenic Central Securities Depository (ATHEXCSD)

HR - Central Depository & Clearing Company Inc. (SKDD)

HU - KELER Ltd

IT - Euronext Securities | Milan

KZ - AIX CSD

KZ - KCSD

LU - Clearstream Banking SA (CBL)

LU - LuxCSD

LV/EE/LT/IS - Nasdaq CSD SE

MD - Single Central Securities Depository (DCU)

ME - CSD & CC Montenegro

MK - Central Securities Depository AD Skopje

MT - Malta Stock Exchange (MSE)

NL - Euroclear Nederland

NO - Euronext Securities | Oslo

PL - Central Securities Depository of Poland (KDPW)

PT - Euronext Securities | Porto

RO - Depozitarul Central

RS - Central Securities Depository and Clearing House (CR HoV)

SE - Euroclear Sweden

SI - KDD Central Securities Clearing Corporation (KDD)

SK - Central Securities Depository of the Slovak Republic (CDCP SR)

TR - Central Securities Depository of Turkey(MKK)

UA - National Depository of Ukraine (NDU)

UK - Euroclear UK & Ireland

References

External links
European Central Securities Depositories Association
presentation on SlideShare
Securities depositories to raise public policy profile (Finextra, 7 September 2010)
New French CSD joins European industry body  (Global investor group, 4 December 2018)
AIX CSD becomes member of European Association of CSDs (Kazinform, 1 April 2019)

Capital markets of Europe
Central securities depositories
Securities clearing and depository institutions